Kevin Burgess may refer to:
 Kevin Burgess (footballer)
 Kevin Burgess (chemist)
 KB (rapper), American Christian hip hop artist and music executive